Gary Laskoski (born June 6, 1959) is a Canadian former professional hockey player. Laskoski played for the Los Angeles Kings in the National Hockey League as a goaltender.

Born in Ottawa, Ontario, Laskoski played 59 games for the Kings over two seasons after playing for the St. Lawrence University Saints of the ECAC for four years. He also played one season with the New Haven Nighthawks of the American Hockey League before retiring in 1984.

External links

1959 births
Living people
Ice hockey people from Ottawa
Los Angeles Kings players
New Haven Nighthawks players
St. Lawrence Saints men's ice hockey players
Undrafted National Hockey League players
Canadian ice hockey goaltenders